Velibor Vasilić (born 13 June 1980 in Tuzla) is a Bosnian professional footballer currently playing for Austrian amateur side SV Kroisegg.

International career
He made his debut for Bosnia and Herzegovina in an October 2008 World Cup qualification match against Armenia and has earned a total of 3 caps, scoring no goals. His final international was a December 2010 friendly match against Poland.

References

External links
 

1980 births
Living people
Sportspeople from Tuzla
Association football defenders
Bosnia and Herzegovina footballers
Bosnia and Herzegovina international footballers
FK Radnik Bijeljina players
NK Zvijezda Gradačac players
FK Željezničar Sarajevo players
TSV Hartberg players
First League of the Republika Srpska players
First League of the Federation of Bosnia and Herzegovina players
Premier League of Bosnia and Herzegovina players
2. Liga (Austria) players
Bosnia and Herzegovina expatriate footballers
Expatriate footballers in Austria
Bosnia and Herzegovina expatriate sportspeople in Austria